Narcissu -Side 2nd- is the prequel to the visual novel Narcissu, produced by Stage-nana.  A preview version was sold at Comiket 70 for ¥200, and has since been released for free download. On May 15, 2007 the entire game was released and made available for download on stage-nana's website. The English version was released on March 31, 2010 by Agilis, after "close to 3 years of blood, sweat, and hard work." Like the Japanese version, this release contains both the prequel and the original. The translation was done in Proportional ONscripter, a fork of ONscripter and a clone of Nscripter, which supports English text as opposed to Nscripter which in turn, doesn't. Additionally, Side 2nd includes both games' soundtracks accessible from the menu of the game.

The game has been released in English with both games included with the option of picking different translations (being from Agilis and Haeleth). The game is playable in either voiced or unvoiced with unvoiced being preferred by the creator. It has been expressed that there were inconsistencies within the original game such as Setsumi never mentioning Himeko but the original creator asks if the player could "think of that as her just not simply expressing it directly".

In-game illustration were drawn by Goto-P except for an image by Yuuki Tsukasa and an image of Yuka by Kyalme. The staff of Cotton-soft also provided help with the design, system and sound editing.

Plot
The game serves as a prequel to the first game, the plot revolves around Setsumi, the female main character from the original visual novel, and the people and circumstances that formed the character presented in the first game.

Narcissu 2 is set about six or seven years before the events of the original Narcissu, while Setsumi was still just a regular outpatient living at home near the hospital. We meet Himeko, a former 7th floor helper at the hospital. Cheerful and full of energy, no one expected that she would one day be a patient in the same ward that she had spent so much time volunteering at. One summer day, while Setsumi was going to the hospital for an examination, Setsumi meets Himeko, and a long summer begins...

Characters
Himeko Shinohara

A 23-year-old girl 7th-floor resident who loves cars and looking at maps. She calls herself a "pseudo-Catholic".

Setsumi Sakura

A quiet 15-year-old girl who befriends Himeko and calls her "Onee-san".

Chihiro Shinohara

Himeko's younger sister. A devout Christian believer with a kind personality and a 7th-floor volunteer.

Yuka Akishima

Himeko's best friend. She's slightly tsundere and girlish, as opposed to Himeko.

Little Girl

A 7th-floor patient that Himeko was charged with. A pure and innocent girl who longs for her parents.

Setsumi's mother
A bright and cheerful person who works hard to pay for Setsumi's hospital fees.

Gameplay
Narcissu: Side 2nd has minimal gameplay in the traditional sense. Player interaction is limited to clicking to advance the text, graphics and sound, although the game features an 'autoplay' mode that makes even this unnecessary.

Narcissu does not contain any decision points at all unlike a lot of visual novels, because it is a member sub category of visual novel known as kinetic novel.

The characters are portrayed by voice actors who recorded out of their schedules and spare time. Voices are optional however; the game is playable in either voiced or unvoiced mode.

Soundtrack
Below is the soundtrack used in Narcissu: Side 2nd as taken from the game. Many different musicians provided music for the game, some being musicians used in the first game and entirely new musicians.

References

External links
 stage-nana — Official website 
 English translation website
 Thai translation website 
 Vietnamese translation forum 
 

2007 video games
Doujin video games
Video games developed in Japan
Visual novels
NScripter games